Scedella spatulata is a species of tephritid or fruit flies in the genus Scedella of the family Tephritidae.

Distribution
Ethiopia, Uganda, Kenya, Malawi.

References

Tephritinae
Insects described in 1957
Diptera of Africa